Integrated circuits are put into protective packages to allow easy handling and assembly onto printed circuit boards and to protect the devices from damage. A very large number of different types of package exist.  Some package types have standardized dimensions and tolerances, and are registered with trade industry associations such as JEDEC and Pro Electron. Other types are proprietary designations that may be made by only one or two manufacturers. Integrated circuit packaging is the last assembly process before testing and shipping devices to customers.

Occasionally specially-processed integrated circuit dies are prepared for direct connections to a substrate without an intermediate header or carrier. In flip chip systems the IC is connected by solder bumps to a substrate. In beam-lead technology, the metallized pads that would be used for wire bonding connections in a conventional chip are thickened and extended to allow external connections to the circuit. Assemblies using "bare" chips have additional packaging or filling with epoxy to protect the devices from moisture.

Through-hole packages 

Through-hole technology uses holes drilled through the printed circuit board (PCB) for mounting the components. The component has leads that are soldered to pads on the PCB to electrically and mechanically connect them to the PCB.

Surface mount 

Chip on board is a packaging technique that directly connects a die to a PCB, without an interposer or lead frame.

Chip carrier 

A chip carrier is a rectangular package with contacts on all four edges. Leaded chip carriers have metal leads wrapped around the edge of the package, in the shape of a letter J.  Leadless chip carriers have metal pads on the edges. Chip carrier packages may be made of ceramic or plastic and are usually secured to a printed circuit board by soldering, though sockets can be used for testing.

Pin grid arrays

Flat packages

Small outline packages

Chip-scale packages

Ball grid array 

Ball grid array (BGA) uses the underside of the package to place pads with balls of solder in grid pattern as connections to PCB.

Transistor, diode, small-pin-count IC packages 

 MELF: Metal electrode leadless face (usually for resistors and diodes)
 SOD: Small-outline diode.
 SOT: Small-outline transistor (also SOT-23, SOT-223, SOT-323).
 TO-XX: wide range of small pin count packages often used for discrete parts like transistors or diodes.
 TO-3: Panel-mount with leads
 TO-5: Metal can package with radial leads
 TO-18: Metal can package with radial leads
 TO-39
 TO-46
 TO-66: Similar shape to the TO-3 but smaller
 TO-92: Plastic-encapsulated package with three leads
 TO-99: Metal can package with eight radial leads
 TO-100
 TO-126: Plastic-encapsulated package with three leads and a hole for mounting on a heat sink
 TO-220: Through-hole plastic package with a (usually) metal heat sink tab and three leads
 TO-226
 TO-247: Plastic-encapsulated package with three leads and a hole for mounting on a heat sink
 TO-251: Also called IPAK: SMT package similar to the DPAK but with longer leads for SMT or TH mounting
 TO-252: (also called SOT428, DPAK): SMT package similar to the DPAK but smaller
 TO-262: Also called I2PAK: SMT package similar to the D2PAK but with longer leads for SMT or TH mounting
 TO-263: Also called D2PAK: SMT package similar to the TO-220 without the extended tab and mounting hole
 TO-274: Also called Super-247: SMT package similar to the TO-247 without the mounting hole

Dimension reference

Surface-mount 

 C Clearance between IC body and PCB
 H Total height
 T Lead thickness
 L Total carrier length 
 LW Lead width
 LL Lead length
 P Pitch

Through-hole

 C Clearance between IC body and board
 H Total height
 T Lead thickness
 L Total carrier length 
 LW Lead width
 LL Lead length
 P Pitch
 WB IC body width
 WL Lead-to-lead width

Package dimensions
All measurements below are given in mm. To convert mm to mils, divide mm by 0.0254 (i.e., 2.54 mm / 0.0254 = 100 mil).

 C Clearance between package body and PCB.
 H Height of package from pin tip to top of package.
 T Thickness of pin.
 L Length of package body only.
 LW Pin width.
 LL Pin length from package to pin tip.
 P Pin pitch (distance between conductors to the PCB).
 WB Width of the package body only.
 WL Length from pin tip to pin tip on the opposite side.

Dual row

Quad rows

LGA

Multi-chip packages 

A variety of techniques for interconnecting several chips within a single package have been proposed and researched:

 SiP (system in package)
 PoP (package on package)
 3D-SICs, Monolithic 3D ICs, and other three-dimensional integrated circuits
 Multi-chip module
 WSI (wafer-scale integration)
 Proximity communication

By terminal count 

Surface-mount components are usually smaller than their counterparts with leads, and are designed to be handled by machines rather than by humans.  The electronics industry has standardized package shapes and sizes (the leading standardisation body is JEDEC).

The codes given in the chart below usually tell the length and width of the components in tenths of millimeters or hundredths of inches. For example, a metric 2520 component is 2.5 mm by 2.0 mm which corresponds roughly to 0.10 inches by 0.08 inches (hence, imperial size is 1008). Exceptions occur for imperial in the two smallest rectangular passive sizes. The metric codes still represent the dimensions in mm, even though the imperial size codes are no longer aligned. These increasingly small sizes, especially 0201 and 01005, can sometimes be a challenge from a manufacturability or reliability perspective.

Two-terminal packages

Rectangular passive components
Mostly resistors and capacitors.

Tantalum capacitors

Aluminum capacitors

Small-outline diode (SOD)

Metal electrode leadless face (MELF)

Mostly resistors and diodes; barrel shaped components, dimensions do not match those of rectangular references for identical codes.

DO-214

Commonly used for rectifier, Schottky, and other diodes.

Three- and four-terminal packages

Small-outline transistor (SOT)

Other 
DPAK (TO-252, SOT-428): Discrete Packaging. Developed by Motorola to house higher powered devices. Comes in three or five-terminal versions.
D2PAK (TO-263, SOT-404): Bigger than the DPAK; basically a surface mount equivalent of the TO220 through-hole package. Comes in 3, 5, 6, 7, 8 or 9-terminal versions.
D3PAK (TO-268): Even larger than D2PAK.

Five- and six-terminal packages

Small-outline transistor (SOT)

Packages with more than six terminals

Dual-in-line

 Flatpack was one of the earliest surface-mounted packages.
 Small-outline integrated circuit (SOIC): dual-in-line, 8 or more pins, gull-wing lead form, pin spacing 1.27 mm.
 Small-outline package, J-leaded (SOJ): The same as SOIC except J-leaded.
 Thin small-outline package (TSOP): thinner than SOIC with smaller pin spacing of 0.5 mm.
 Shrink small-outline package (SSOP): pin spacing of 0.65 mm, sometimes 0.635 mm or in some cases 0.8 mm.
 Thin shrink small-outline package (TSSOP).
 Quarter-size small-outline package (QSOP): with pin spacing of 0.635 mm.
 Very small outline package (VSOP): even smaller than QSOP; 0.4-, 0.5-, or 0.65-mm pin spacing.
 Dual flat no-lead (DFN): smaller footprint than leaded equivalent.

Quad-in-line
Quad-in-line:
Plastic leaded chip carrier (PLCC): square, J-lead, pin spacing 1.27 mm
Quad flat package (QFP): various sizes, with pins on all four sides
Low-profile quad flat-package (LQFP): 1.4 mm high, varying sized and pins on all four sides
Plastic quad flat-pack (PQFP), a square with pins on all four sides, 44 or more pins
Ceramic quad flat-pack (CQFP): similar to PQFP
Metric quad flat-pack (MQFP): a QFP package with metric pin distribution
Thin quad flat-pack (TQFP), a thinner version of LQFP
Quad flat no-lead (QFN): smaller footprint than leaded equivalent
Leadless chip carrier (LCC): contacts are recessed vertically to "wick-in" solder. Common in aviation electronics because of robustness to mechanical vibration.
Micro leadframe package (MLP, MLF): with a 0.5 mm contact pitch, no leads (same as QFN)
Power quad flat no-lead (PQFN): with exposed die-pads for heatsinking

Grid arrays
 Ball grid array (BGA): A square or rectangular array of solder balls on one surface, ball spacing typically 
 Fine-pitch ball grid array (FBGA): A square or rectangular array of solder balls on one surface
 Low-profile fine-pitch ball grid array (LFBGA): A square or rectangular array of solder balls on one surface, ball spacing typically 0.8 mm
 Micro ball grid array (μBGA): Ball spacing less than 1 mm
 Thin fine-pitch ball grid array (TFBGA): A square or rectangular array of solder balls on one surface, ball spacing typically 0.5 mm
 Land grid array (LGA): An array of bare lands only. Similar to in appearance to QFN, but mating is by spring pins within a socket rather than solder.
 Column grid array (CGA): A circuit package in which the input and output points are high-temperature solder cylinders or columns arranged in a grid pattern.
 Ceramic column grid array (CCGA): A circuit package in which the input and output points are high-temperature solder cylinders or columns arranged in a grid pattern.  The body of the component is ceramic.
 Lead-less package (LLP): A package with metric pin distribution (0.5 mm pitch).

Non-packaged devices
Although surface-mount, these devices require specific process for assembly.
Chip-on-board (COB), a bare silicon chip, that is usually an integrated circuit, is supplied without a package (which is usually a lead frame overmolded with epoxy) and is attached, often with epoxy, directly to a circuit board.  The chip is then wire bonded and protected from mechanical damage and contamination by an epoxy "glob-top".
Chip-on-flex (COF), a variation of COB, where a chip is mounted directly to a flex circuit. Tape-automated bonding process is also a chip-on-flex process as well. 
Chip-on-glass (COG), a variation of COB, where a chip, typically a liquid crystal display (LCD) controller, is mounted directly on glass.
Chip-on-wire (COW), a variation of COB, where a chip, typically a LED or RFID chip, is mounted directly on wire, thus making it a very thin and flexible wire. Such wire may then be covered with cotton, glass or other materials to make into smart textiles or electronic textiles.

There are often subtle variations in package details from manufacturer to manufacturer, and even though standard designations are used, designers need to confirm dimensions when laying out printed circuit boards.

See also 

 Surface-mount technology
 Three-dimensional integrated circuit
 Interposer
 IPC (electronics)
 List of chip carriers
 List of electronics package dimensions
 Redistribution layer
 Small-outline transistor
 Wafer-level packaging

References

External links 

 JEDEC JEP95 official list of all (over 500) standard electronic packages
 Fairchild Index of Package Information
 An illustrated listing of different package types, with links to typical dimensions/features of each
 Intersil packaging information
 ICpackage.org
 Solder Pad Layout Dimensions
 International Microelectronics And Packaging Society

 
Semiconductor packages
Electronics lists